Younine, also spelled Yunin, is a municipality in the Baalbek District of the Baalbek-Hermel Governorate in northeastern Lebanon. It had 6,557 registered voters in 2010. Its inhabitants are Shia Muslims.

History
Younine was the ancestral village of the 13th-century Mamluk hadith scholars Abd Allah al-Yunini (d. 1220) and Qutb al-Din Musa ibn Muhammad al-Yunini al-Hanbali of Damascus. Qutb al-Din also owned a residence in the village. At the time Younine also contained a Sufi lodge. The archer Husayn al-Yunini also hailed from Younine.

In 1838, Eli Smith noted  Yunin  as a Metawileh village in the Baalbek area.

References

Bibliography

External links
Younine, localiban

Populated places in Baalbek District
Shia Muslim communities in Lebanon